Deh-e Shib (also Romanized as Deh-e Shīb and Deh Shīb; also known as Deh Shīr and Deh Sho’eyb) is a village in Ravar Rural District, in the Central District of Ravar County, Kerman Province, Iran. At the 2006 census, its population was 187, in 49 families.

References 

Populated places in Ravar County